Border Outlaws is a 1950 American Western film directed by Richard Talmadge and written by Arthur Hoerl. The film stars Spade Cooley, Maria Hart, Bill Edwards, Bill Kennedy, George Slocum, and John Laurenz. The film was released on November 2, 1950, by Eagle-Lion Films.

Plot

Cast          
Spade Cooley as Spade Cooley
Maria Hart as Jill Kimball
Bill Edwards as Mike Hoskins
Bill Kennedy as Carson
George Slocum as Hal Turner
John Laurenz as Kevin
Douglas Wood as Kimball
Bud Osborne as Sheriff Banyon
Johnny Carpenter as Keller

References

External links
 

1950 films
American Western (genre) films
1950 Western (genre) films
Eagle-Lion Films films
American black-and-white films
1950s English-language films
1950s American films